Nicolas Kiefer (born 5 July 1977) is a German former professional tennis player. He reached the semifinals of the 2006 Australian Open and won a silver medal in men's doubles with partner Rainer Schüttler at the 2004 Athens Olympics. Kiefer's career-high singles ranking was world No. 4, achieved in January 2000.

Tennis career

1995–2005
Kiefer was taken notice of as an outstanding junior. He won the Junior Australian Open, the US Open, and was a finalist and semifinalist at Wimbledon and the French Open finishing as the No. 2 junior behind Mariano Zabaleta when he was 18 in 1995. On 10 January 2000, he reached his second quarterfinal at the Australian Open and afterwards was ranked world No. 4, his highest position.

Kiefer was known to have some tennis superstitions. He was sometimes seen tapping his racquet on the corners of the court after a point, and, when serving, frequently asked for the ball with which he had just won a point to re-use it for the next one.

2006–2007
Kiefer became infamous for an incident on 25 January 2006, during the quarterfinals of the Australian Open. While facing Sébastien Grosjean late in the fifth set of a marathon match, Kiefer threw his racquet midpoint. Grosjean lost the point, hitting the ball into the net. Grosjean protested that the racquet distracted his shot. The umpire Carlos Bernardes said he did not believe the act was intentional and noted Grosjean had already hit the ball before the flying racquet could have had any effect on his shot. Grosjean eventually lost the fifth and final set to Kiefer. Kiefer went through to the semi-finals where he was defeated by the 2004 champion Roger Federer.

Kiefer injured his wrist while playing at the 2006 French Open, and announced his return on 5 July 2007, having fallen to the 404th position on ATP. He announced that he was "tired of waiting and anxious to start traveling again and to see his name on scoreboards". Kiefer returned at the 2007 Gerry Weber Open, losing in the first round to eventual champion Tomáš Berdych. At Wimbledon, he made the third round after defeating No.30 seed Filippo Volandri and Fabrice Santoro, both in straight sets, before losing in 4 sets (3 of which were tiebreakers) to Novak Djokovic. At Newport, however, he ended up losing in round 1. At Los Angeles, he reached the semifinals in only his 4th tournament since coming back from injury; he had to default against Radek Štěpánek, another player coming back from injury, because of an injury sustained during his quarter-final win. He also made an impressive showing at the 2007 Madrid Masters, where he beat number five seed Fernando González in the quarterfinals before losing in the semifinals to world number one Roger Federer 6–4, 6–4.

2008
His 2008 season did not start out well: he lost in the first round of the Australian Open to former world No.1 Juan Carlos Ferrero, first round of 2008 Indian Wells Masters to Dudi Sela, third round of 2008 Miami Masters to world No.2 Rafael Nadal, second round of 2008 Monte Carlo Masters to Philipp Kohlschreiber, first round of 2008 Rome Masters to Ferrero. His first notable result was the quarterfinals of the 2008 Hamburg Masters with victories over world No.10 Stanislas Wawrinka and world No.4 Nikolay Davydenko before losing to Andreas Seppi in three sets. He would lose in the third round of 2008 Wimbledon Championships to Nadal. During the 2008 Canada Masters, at age 31 and ranked No. 37, he made his first Masters final after 73 previous tries, previously finishing as a semifinalist at the 1999 and 2004 Canada Masters (lost to Thomas Johansson and Andy Roddick respectively) and 2007 Madrid Masters (lost to Federer). Along the way, he defeated Mardy Fish, 15th seed Mikhail Youzhny, fourth seed Nikolay Davydenko, seventh seed James Blake, and Gilles Simon; the win over Simon was especially notable because Simon had defeated world No. 1 Roger Federer in the second round. He lost to Nadal in the final in straight sets. Because of his run, he broke back into the top 20 at No. 19.

2009
In 2009, he represented Germany in the 2009 Hopman Cup with 19-year-old Sabine Lisicki. In the first match, he lost against Australia's Lleyton Hewitt, who had been six months inactive due to an injury. In the second singles match, Kiefer lost again, this time to USA's James Blake. Nevertheless, Kiefer won both of the doubles matches with Sabine Lisicki against both Australia and the United States. In the third singles match, Kiefer twisted his ankle against Slovakia's Dominik Hrbatý in the first set when Kiefer was up 3–1 and serving. This injury prevented him from participating in the 2009 Australian Open.

He re-appeared in the 2009 Davis Cup match against Austria in which he won in the doubles match with Philipp Kohlschreiber against Julian Knowle and Alexander Peya in four sets. Kiefer also played a singles match, the fourth match, against Jürgen Melzer in which Kiefer won in straight sets and gave Germany the victory against Austria. Kiefer then participated in the 2009 BNP Paribas Open at Indian Wells in which he beat Bobby Reynolds in straight sets in the second round, but he then lost in the third round to Andy Roddick.

In the 2009 Sony Ericsson Open in Miami, Kiefer beat "the magician" Fabrice Santoro in the second round. In the third round Kiefer was defeated by world No. 2 Roger Federer.
At the 2009 Monte-Carlo Rolex Masters, Kiefer lost in his first match against qualifier Andreas Beck. At the 2009 Internazionali BNL d'Italia in Rome, Kiefer lost again in his first match against Juan Mónaco in straight sets. In the 2009 BMW Open Kiefer was down against Ernests Gulbis 2–6, 0–2 but eventually won in three sets. Kiefer said after the match, "Clay and me, we will never be the best of friends". Kiefer suffered from back problems which eventually made him lose against Jérémy Chardy in the next round.

At the 2009 Mutua Madrileña Madrid Open he lost against Tommy Robredo. Kiefer then played the 2009 ARAG World Team Cup, in which he played the doubles matches with Mischa Zverev. They won all of their matches, and Germany reached the final, but lost against Serbia. Despite Germany losing, Kiefer won the doubles match in the final against Viktor Troicki and doubles world No. 1 Nenad Zimonjić.

Kiefer then participated at the 2009 French Open in which he beat qualifier Ilija Bozoljac in four sets. However, Kiefer lost in the second round against world No. 14 David Ferrer in five sets. Despite this loss, Kiefer claimed that he was proud that he had played up to a fifth set against one of the best tennis players of the world on clay, since clay is Kiefer's least favourite surface.
The clay season had now ended, and the grass season started with Kiefer's participation in his favourite tournament, the 2009 Gerry Weber Open. In the first match, he thrashed Viktor Troicki, but retired in the second round against Jürgen Melzer when he was down 1–6 with a muscular strain in his abdomen which forced him to retire from singles and doubles, where he had reached the semifinals with Mischa Zverev.

Kiefer participated in the Wimbledon as the 33rd seed but having not fully recovered from his abdomen injury. This was reflected in his match against Fabrice Santoro, where Kiefer lost in straight sets. Kiefer then played for Germany in the 2009 Davis Cup quarterfinals against Spain. He did so in the doubles match with Mischa Zverev against Spain's Fernando Verdasco and Feliciano López. Kiefer and Zverev lost the match. In the first round of the U.S Open, he beat Michaël Llodra in straight sets, but in the second round he lost to world No. 3 Rafael Nadal.

Major finals

Olympic finals

Doubles: 1 (1 silver medal)

Masters Series finals

Singles: 1 (1 runner-up)

Career finals

Singles: 19 (6 titles, 13 runner-ups)

Doubles (3 titles, 1 runner-up)

Performance timeline

Singles

Top 10 wins

Record against No. 1 players
Kiefer's match record against players who have been ranked world No. 1.

References

External links

 
 
 
 Kiefer world ranking history
 Official web site 

1977 births
Living people
People from Holzminden
Australian Open (tennis) junior champions
German male tennis players
Hopman Cup competitors
Olympic medalists in tennis
Olympic silver medalists for Germany
Olympic tennis players of Germany
People from Holzminden (district)
Tennis players at the 2000 Summer Olympics
Tennis players at the 2004 Summer Olympics
Tennis players at the 2008 Summer Olympics
US Open (tennis) junior champions
Medalists at the 2004 Summer Olympics
Grand Slam (tennis) champions in boys' singles
Tennis people from Lower Saxony